James Alaric Cudworth (August 22, 1858 – December 21, 1943) was a 19th-century American professional baseball player. Nicknamed "Cuddy", he played for the Kansas City Cowboys of the Union Association in 1884.

External links

1858 births
1943 deaths
Major League Baseball first basemen
Kansas City Cowboys (UA) players
19th-century baseball players
Bay City (minor league baseball) players
Brockton (minor league baseball) players
Lowell Magicians players
Lowell Chippies players
Worcester Grays players
New Haven (minor league baseball) players
New Haven Nutmegs players
Providence Clamdiggers (baseball) players
Lowell Lowells players
Lowell (minor league baseball) players
Manchester (minor league baseball) players
Boston Reds (minor league) players
Haverhill (minor league baseball) players
Minor league baseball managers
Baseball players from Massachusetts